William Ker may refer to:

William Ker, Lord Ker (d. 1618), the eldest son of Robert Ker, 1st Earl of Roxburghe
William Ker, 2nd Earl of Roxburghe (d. 1675), Scottish nobleman
William Paton Ker (1855–1923), Scottish literary scholar and essayist
William Ker (footballer) (1852–1911), Scottish international footballer
William Balfour Ker (1877–1918), American illustrator

See also
William Kerr (disambiguation)